Mama Kin Spender is an Australian music duo made up of Mama Kin and Dingo Spender (Offcutts). They released their debut album Golden Magnetic in 2018 and it was nominated for the 2018 ARIA Award for Best Blues and Roots Album.

Members
Mama Kin - vocals, drums
Tommy Spender - vocals, guitar

Discography

Studio albums

EPs

Awards and nominations

ARIA Music Awards
The ARIA Music Awards is an annual awards ceremony that recognises excellence, innovation, and achievement across all genres of Australian music. 

|-
| 2018
| Golden Magnetic
| Best Blues & Roots Album
| 
|-

West Australian Music Industry Awards
The West Australian Music Industry Awards (WAMIs) are annual awards presented to the local contemporary music industry, put on annually by the Western Australian Music Industry Association Inc (WAM).
 
 (wins only)
|-
| 2013
| Mama Kin
| Best Folk Act 
| 
|-
| 2018
| Mama Kin Spender
| Best Blues / Roots Act 
| 
|-

References

External links
Mama Kin Spender

Australian musical duos
Male–female musical duos